Kristi Lynn Kang (née Bingham, born March 24, 1984) is an American voice actress affiliated with Funimation. She has provided voices for a number of English-language versions of Japanese anime films and television series.  She voiced Kyoka Kanejo in B Gata H Kei Yamada's First Time, Levy McGarden in Fairy Tail, Shoko Uemura in Rideback, and Miharu Shimizu in Baka and Test. Besides being a voice actor, she is a yoga instructor in the Arlington and Mansfield, Texas area.

Filmography

Anime

Notes

References

External links
 

1984 births
Living people
American voice actresses
People from Arlington, Texas
University of Texas at Arlington alumni
Actresses from Texas
21st-century American actresses
American film actresses
American television actresses
Lamar High School (Arlington, Texas) alumni
American yoga teachers
Educators from Texas
American women educators